Canada competed at the 1928 Summer Olympics in Amsterdam, Netherlands. 69 competitors, 62 men and 7 women, took part in 49 events in 8 sports.

Medalists

Athletics

32 athletes represented Canada in 1928. It was the nation's 7th appearance in the sport, having competed in athletics at every Olympics to date. After failing to win any medals in 1924, Canada returned to the athletics podium in 1928 with 4 golds, 2 silvers, and 2 bronzes.

The women's relay team broke the world record twice on the way to winning the gold medal. Percy Williams won both of the men's sprint events, twice matching the Olympic record in the 100 metres. Bobbie Rosenfeld briefly held the Olympic record in the women's 100 metres, setting it at 12.4 seconds in the semifinals before that mark was bested by all three medalists, including Rosenfeld and Smith (with the record ultimately ending with American gold medalist Betty Robinson at 12.2 seconds).

 Track and road events

Boxing

7 boxers, all men, represented Canada in 1928. It was the nation's 3rd appearance in the sport. Canada had a boxer in every weight class except the heavyweight. For the second straight Games, Canada won exactly one bronze medal in boxing.

Cycling

Six cyclists, all men, represented Canada in 1928. It was the nation's 5th appearance in the sport. Joe Laporte had previously competed in 1924.

Road cycling

Track cycling

 Time trial

 Match races

Diving

One man represented Canada in diving in 1928. It was the nation's 4th appearance in the sport and first since 1920. Phillips advanced to the finals in both events, placing 7th in each.

Rowing

11 rowers, all men, represented Canada in 1928. It was the nation's 6th appearance in the sport, tying Belgium and Great Britain for most appearances. Canada had 3 boats compete and won one silver medal in men's double sculls (matching its best ever result in the sport) and one bronze medal in the men's eight, as well as an effectively 5th place finish in men's single sculls after Wright was defeated in the quarterfinal round.

Swimming

6 swimmers, 5 men and 1 women, represented Canada in 1928. It was nation's 5th appearance in the sport and the first time the nation sent a female swimmer. Canada won a bronze medal in the men's relay, the first medal in the sport for Canada since 1920. In the individual events, Canadian swimmers advanced to 3 finals but took 6th place each time.

Wrestling

5 wrestlers, all men, competed for Canada in 1928. They competed only in the freestyle discipline. It was the nation's 4th appearance in the sport. Canadian wrestlers won a silver medal (the nation's best result in the sport so far, improving on a bronze medal in 1908) and 2 bronze medals.

Freestyle wrestling

Art competitions

References

External links

sports-reference

Nations at the 1928 Summer Olympics
1928
Summer Olympics